Simona Dyanova Dyankova (born 7 December 1994) is a Bulgarian former group rhythmic gymnast. She is the 2020 Olympic group all-around champion and the 2018 World 5 hoops champion. She is a two-time (2018, 2019) World group all-around bronze medalist, the 2017 World group all-around silver medalist, and the 2018 European group all-around bronze medalist.

Career 
Dyankova began rhythmic gymnastics when she was six years old. She was a reserve for Bulgaria's main senior group in 2014, 2015, and 2016.

2017 
Dyankova began competing with Bulgaria's main senior group in 2017. At the Pesaro World Cup, she won the gold medal in the group all-around and the silver medal in the 5 hoops final. The Bulgarian group won another group all-around gold medal at the Baku World Cup and a silver medal in 3 balls + 2 ropes and a bronze medal in 5 hoops. Then at the Sofia World Cup, they won another group all-around gold and silver medals in both apparatus finals behind Ukraine. She competed at the 2017 World Championships alongside Elena Bineva, Madlen Radukanova, Laura Traets and Teodora Aleksandrova. They won the silver medal in the group all-around behind Russia and the bronze medal in the 3 balls + 2 ropes final behind Russia and Japan. They also placed fourth in the 5 hoops final.

2018 
At the Sofia World Cup, Dyankova and the Bulgarian group won gold in the group all-around and in 5 hoops and bronze in 3 balls + 2 ropes. Then at the Baku World Cup they won gold in both apparatus finals but lost the group all-around to Italy. They won another group all-around gold medal at the Guadalajara World Challenge Cup in addition to winning gold in 3 balls + 2 ropes and silver in 5 hoops. She then competed at the European Championships alongside Elena Bineva, Madlen Radukanova, Laura Traets, and Stefani Kiryakova. They won the bronze medal in the group all-around behind Russia and Italy and placed fourth in the 5 hoops final. In the 3 balls + 2 ropes final, they won the gold medal, and they won a team bronze medal with the individual juniors. Then at the Kazan World Challenge Cup, they won the group all-around bronze medal behind Italy and Russia, and they won silver in 5 hoops behind Russia. The same group competed at the World Championships in Sofia where they won the group all-around bronze medal behind Russia and Italy and qualified for the 2020 Olympic Games. They then won the gold medal in the 5 hoops final and placed sixth in 3 balls + 2 ropes.

2019 
Dyankova competed with Stefani Kiryakova, Madlen Radukanova, Laura Traets, and Erika Zafirova during the 2019 season. The group won the gold medal in the 3 hoops + 4 clubs final and the silver medal in the group all-around at the Pesaro World Cup. Then at the Sofia World Cup, they won the group all-around gold medal. She represented Bulgaria at the 2019 European Games where the Bulgarian group won silver in the group all-around by only 0.050 behind Belarus. They also won the silver medal in the 5 balls final, this time behind Russia. In the 3 hoops + 4 clubs final, they won the bronze medal behind Belarus and Ukraine. She then competed at the World Championships in Baku where the Bulgarian group won the bronze medal in the group all-around behind Russia and Japan. They then won the silver medal behind Japan in the 5 balls final, and they placed fifth in the 3 hoops + 4 clubs final.

2021 
The Bulgarian team began their year at the Sofia World Cup, where the team won gold in the group all-around and in both apparatus finals. They once again swept the gold medals at the Baku World Cup. She then competed at the European Championships in Varna, Bulgaria. The Bulgarian team of the senior group, Boryana Kaleyn, and Katrin Taseva finished in fourth place. The Bulgarian group finished fifth in the all-around, but they won gold in the 5 balls final and won silver in the 3 hoops + 4 clubs final behind Israel.

Dyankova was selected to represent Bulgaria at the 2020 Summer Olympics alongside Laura Traets, Stefani Kiryakova, Madlen Radukanova, and Erika Zafirova. In the qualification round, the group qualified in first place after receiving the highest scores for both of their routines. In the group all-around final, they once again received the highest scores for both routines and won the gold medal with a total score of 92.100, 1.400 points ahead of Russia. This marked the first time a non-Russian team won the Olympic gold medal in the group all-around since Spain won in 1996, and it was the first time Bulgaria won the Olympic group all-around competition. Dyankova was selected to be the flag bearer for Bulgaria in the closing ceremonies.

The Bulgarian group withdrew from the World Championships in Kitakyushu, Japan, four days before the start of the competition, after an injury to Laura Traets. Dyankova announced her retirement on 28 October 2021.

Personal life
Dyankova is engaged to Bulgarian footballer Nikola Yanachkov.

Detailed results

References

External links
 
 

Bulgarian rhythmic gymnasts
1994 births
Living people
Gymnasts at the 2019 European Games
European Games medalists in gymnastics
European Games silver medalists for Bulgaria
European Games bronze medalists for Bulgaria
Medalists at the Rhythmic Gymnastics European Championships
Medalists at the Rhythmic Gymnastics World Championships
Sportspeople from Varna, Bulgaria
Gymnasts at the 2020 Summer Olympics
Olympic gymnasts of Bulgaria
Olympic medalists in gymnastics
Olympic gold medalists for Bulgaria
Medalists at the 2020 Summer Olympics
21st-century Bulgarian women